Pleuropholis is an extinct genus of prehistoric ray-finned fish.

See also
 List of prehistoric bony fish genera

References

Prehistoric bony fish genera
Fossil taxa described in 1858